Theodore "Teddy" Smith (January 22, 1932, in Washington, D.C.—August 24, 1979, in Washington, D.C.) was an American jazz double-bassist.

Smith played with Betty Carter in 1960, and with Clifford Jordan (with whom he recorded the LP Bearcat in 1962) and Kenny Dorham in 1961-62. In 1962-63 he played with Jackie McLean and Slide Hampton. Following this he played with Horace Silver, including at the 1964 Montreux, Antibes, and Paris jazz festivals and on the album Song for My Father. Following this Smith played with Sonny Rollins (1964–65) and Sonny Simmons (1966).

Smith's performance on the title track of Song for My Father, beginning with the opening unison figure between Smith's bass and Silver's piano, has been one of the most widely heard pieces of jazz music in the world for nearly a half-century and an influence on such artists as Stevie Wonder and Steely Dan.

Discography
With Kenny Dorham
Matador (United Artists, 1962)
With Rufus Jones
Five on Eight (Cameo, 1964)
With Clifford Jordan
Bearcat (Jazzland, 1962)
With Sonny Rollins
The Standard Sonny Rollins (RCA Victor, 1964)
With Horace Silver
Song for My Father (Blue Note, 1964)
Live 1964 (Emerald, 1984)

References
"Teddy Smith", Grove Jazz online.

1932 births
1979 deaths
American jazz double-bassists
Male double-bassists
Musicians from Washington, D.C.
20th-century American musicians
20th-century double-bassists
20th-century American male musicians
American male jazz musicians